James Ward was the defending champion, but he lost against Víctor Estrella in the first round.
Kei Nishikori, who played in this tournament as a 'special exempt', won in the final 2–6, 6–3, 6–4, against Brian Dabul.

Seeds

Draw

Finals

Top half

Bottom half

References
Main Draw
Qualifying Singles

2010 ATP Challenger Tour
2010 Singles